Archithosia makomensis is a moth of the  subfamily Arctiinae. It was described by Strand in 1912. It is found in Cameroon, Equatorial Guinea, Ghana and Nigeria.

References

Moths described in 1912
Lithosiini
Moths of Africa